The Best of The Lettermen is a compilation album featuring the music of The Lettermen. Originally released on vinyl in 1966, it was produced by Steve Douglas. All tracks were arranged by Jimmie Haskell except "You'll Never Walk Alone" which was arranged by Hank Levine.

Track listing
"When I Fall in Love"
"She Cried"
"If Ever I Would Leave You"
"Love Is A-Many Splendored Thing"
"Yesterday"
"The Way You Look Tonight"
"Theme from "A Summer Place"
"You'll Never Walk Alone"
"Smile"
"Portrait of My Love"
"Secretly"

References

External links

The Lettermen albums
1966 greatest hits albums
Capitol Records compilation albums